This is a list of manga related to the anime series Cowboy Bebop.



Cowboy Bebop: Shooting Star
The manga series written by Kuga Cain loosely based on the anime series. It is an alternative telling of the story featured in the anime television series, with some changes to character designs, and the character of Ed portrayed as being male. While the original Japanese manga chapters were called "Shoots" without titles, the English version adds movie titles to each chapter (akin to the anime's frequent use of song titles). The serialisation was canceled in mid-1998, leaving some plot points unresolved.

Cowboy Bebop

Chapter not released in tankōbon format 
 "Monkey Magic"

References

Cowboy Bebop
Cowboy Bebop